This list of public art in Baltimore provides an introduction to public art which is accessible in an outdoor public space in Baltimore. Because the collection of public art is extensive and continues to grow, the list is incomplete.  A fuller picture is available externally at:

 Baltimore City Public Art Inventory as of 2012
 Smithsonian American Art Museum, Art Inventories Catalog – database for Baltimore

Selected artworks

Further reading
 Kelly, Cindy. Outdoor Sculpture in Baltimore: A Historical Guide to Public Art in the Monumental City.  Johns Hopkins University Press, 2011.

References

Art, Public
Baltimore
.

Art, Public